Nikolay Nikolayevich Dukhonin (13 December 1876 – 3 December 1917) was a Russian general, the last commander-in-chief of the Imperial Russian Army.

Biography
Dukhonin was born in the Smolensk Governorate. He served in the Kiev Military District before the start of the First World War. There he gained some experience in intelligence work.

At the outset of the War, Dukhonin was given command of a Russian regiment. He was then assigned to the Third Army in Dubno under General Ruzsky as senior adjutant of the intelligence department. In the spring of 1917 he was the chief of staff of the Southwestern Front, In August 1917, Dukhonin was Quartermaster General of the Southwestern Front, and was plucked from this relative obscurity by Kerensky to replace Alexeyev as Chief of Staff at GHQ in Mogilev, as Alexeyev had resigned as a result of Kornilov's failed coup. It was Alexeyev who had suggested Dukhonin as his successor so that he could continue to influence affairs at Stavka in Mogilev.

When Kerensky fled Petrograd and then Russia following the seizure of power by the Bolsheviks in the October Revolution, Dukhonin became de facto Supreme Commander, albeit of an army that was rapidly disintegrating, and over which he exercised very little control. During the initial stages of the Bolshevik seizure of power the Council of People's Commissars instructed Dukhonin to cease wartime hostilities and open negotiations with the Central Powers. Lenin and Krylenko visited Dukhonin in Petrograd to discuss an armistice proposal. Dukhonin's response was adamant: on 22 November he categorically declined the directive of the Council of People's Commissars. He had discussed such a development with diplomats from the Entente governments. Dukhonin told Lenin that such an order could only be issued by "a government sustained by the army and the country".

Lenin immediately proceeded to a wireless station and broadcast news of Dukhonin's dismissal as Commander-in-Chief and Krylenko's replacement in his stead. The following day a joint note was issued by the military missions of Britain, France, Italy, Japan and Romania, citing the Treaty of 23 August 1914 by which the allies agreed not to conclude an armistice except by common consent. These missions were based at the General Headquarters in Mogilev. His last action was to order the release of the officers being held prisoner at Bikhov, most notably Kornilov and Denikin.

Dukhonin subsequently surrendered to Krylenko in Mogilev, but was murdered by Krylenko's Bolshevik military escort near the railway station on 3 December 1917.  A mob of soldiers and sailors bayoneted him to death on the spot on order of Red Army officer Pavel Dybenko. The next morning the Bolshevik soldiers and sailors amused themselves by using his (now stripped naked) corpse for target practice, which they had placed on the platform with a cigarette in its mouth.

His family emigrated to Yugoslavia.

References

External links
Short biography

1876 births
1917 deaths
People from Smolensky District, Smolensk Oblast
People from Smolensky Uyezd
Commanders-in-chief of the Russian Army
Imperial Russian Army generals
Russian Provisional Government generals
Recipients of the Order of Saint Stanislaus (Russian)
Recipients of the Order of St. George of the Third Degree
Executed people from Smolensk Oblast
People murdered in Belarus
Victims of Red Terror in Soviet Russia
Russian murder victims
People executed by stabbing
1917 murders in Europe